Kjersti Toppe (born 20 October 1967) is a Norwegian doctor and politician representing the Centre Party. She has served as minister of children and families since 2021, and an MP from Hordaland since 2009.

Career

Parliament
Toppe was her party's top nominee for Hordaland in the 2009 election and was elected to the Storting in September. Prior to her election to parliament, Toppe served as the Centre Party's sole representative in the Bergen city council since 2001.

In parliament, Toppe was assigned to the position as deputy leader of the Standing Committee on Health and Care Services. During the election campaign, healthcare was her main issue, and she pledged to work against closure of rural hospitals. Toppe also served as the party's spokesperson for health policy.

Minister of Children and Families
Toppe was appointed minister of children and families on 14 October 2021 in Støre's Cabinet.

Following revelations that the Norwegian System of Patient Injury Compensation had not met with people who demanded compensation for injuries, Toppe expressed surprise of the compensation's actions, and said that she had at least expected them to meet with the people in question. She did not rule out that their methods could revolve around income or people's finances. She further that there will be a full review of the compensation's methods and did not rule out that it should be changed.

A father filed a complaint to the Norwegian Parliamentary Ombud regarding his loss of 67 days of his paid paternity leave because he had applied after the Norwegian Labour and Welfare Administration's deadline. His complaint expressed that NAV had no legal authority to deprive him of the money. The ombudsman supported him, but despite this, NAV didn't comply. Toppe expressed support for NAV's judicial evaluation, commenting that the case was complicated. She further stated that the ombudsman had reached a different conclusion then NAV and the Social Security Court, and that the ministry would stand behind NAV's conclusion.

More than 13 cases against Norway were brought up by the European Court of Human Rights regarding child neglect and breaches of human rights from the Norwegian Child Welfare Services. On 26 November, Toppe expressed understanding. She further remarked that the breaches of human rights were serious and unacceptable. She also stressed that it was her responsibility to make sure that the Child Welfare Services upheld human rights obligations.

On 7 December, in a Teams meeting with the Norwegian Union of Social Educators and Social Workers, Toppe promised to have a look at turnover and incitement against Child Welfare Service workers. She notably said: "I want to highlight the work you do and work to ensure that you feel safe and well at work".

After VG had been denied insight to documents from the Norwegian Child Welfare Services due to concerns to maintain their reputation; Toppe expressed concern that it could cause distrust in the Child Welfare Services. She also said that the Services behaved "too locked", and also cited that concerns for reputation had never been used as an argument before. She also mentioned that the Services should be more transparent and open to the public and provide more insight.

With a crisis help centre in Karasjok closed down in 2019, criticism has been pointed to the municipality for not having taken proper action to come with a better alternative. Toppe added to this criticism in early March 2022, saying it was "unfortunate" for the municipality to send their own citizens to the closest centre in Hammerfest.

On 24 March, Toppe expressed that the government should consider three-part leave, having reservations about the scheme actually benefiting families with children and their needs. Her concerns notably stemmed from the fact that many women now take a longer period of leave without pay and pensionable income. She stated: "It is not good from a gender equality perspective. And then I question whether this is because the scheme is not well enough adapted for the lives of families with children and families with children. I want to take a closer look at that".

In the wake of revelations by Aftenposten showing that mentally ill children wasn’t receiving necessary care and treatment by children’s welfare services, Toppe demanded an investigation into the matter, saying: "We must get an overview of the number of children in child welfare with serious mental illness.  We need to know what we are doing with these children today and map out whether the regions believe there is failure around them".

On 16 June, Toppe unveiled the first ever logo marker notifying of changes to a person’s appearance in advertisements. Norway is also the first country to utilise such a logo. Toppe stated: "You should be aware of what is not natural. We want less use of retouched images. This is a way we from the authorities can help reduce some of the body pressure young people experience". A proposal for such a logo was first put forward in 2021, before now coming into effect.

On 20 June, Toppe received backlash due to her stance on surrogacy and the affects it has on society. She compared it to human trafficking, expressed concerns for children to become orphans and that it should be punishable. She later emphasised that it was only her personal opinion, and not the government's policy. Her fellow minister, Anette Trettebergstuen, expressed disagreement with her, a sentiment shared by Grunde Almeland of the Liberal Party and chair of the Standing Committee on Family and Cultural Affairs, who said: "It's outrageous that a family minister will punish children who come to Norway, as she indirectly says. This is law in the United States, and Norway can not regulate other countries' legislation. We must recognize that, and secure rights. We must dare to take the discussion and get legislation that makes good demands, so that the children and women are taken care of in the best possible way".

In August, after the Ombudsman for Children expressed that children between 15 and 18 should be able to consent to doping tests on their own accord, Toppe later confirmed that her ministry would be looking into the issue. However, she did state that 15 to 18 year olds should have consent competence before consenting to a doping test, stating: "Like the Children's Ombudsman, I believe that there is a lot of evidence that children must be competent to consent to doping tests when they are between 15 and 18 years old. It is also the case that children today are of legal age according to health legislation when they are 16". She also remarked that the responsibility for changing doping test rules would fall under the Ministry of Culture.

On 5 September, Toppe issued an apology to parents who had been wrongly reported by schools to the Child Welfare Services and called it "what they've been through, was a massive mistake".

On 30 September, Toppe revealed that 96 million NOK of the 2023 state budget would be used to invest in activities for children who require help to partake in activities.

In October, Toppe called for child welfare services activist Rune Fardal to delete videos of vulnerable children on the internet. She also called for him to not repeat his offences, but also admitted that his activism was a response to a poor maintained child welfare service. Fardal himself said that he has released the videos of the children with their parents' permission had yet to receive any calls for him to remove any of them.

On 25 October, she expressed that angry consumers and branch norms could assist retail shop companies in the fight against shrink inflation. She also confirmed that the government hadn't looked on the issue yet.

As the government's budget negotiations with the Socialist Left Party commenced in November, opposition parties, the Red Party and the Christian Democrats criticised the government for not increasing the child benefits like other measures to counter the rise in prices. Toppe agreed with their sentiment, but argued that the government had already put important measures for children's interests, including in the new state budget.

On 16 November, Toppe announced that the government would launch an investigation into reports of foreign adoptions that were illegal. More specifically, the investigation would look into the adoption system. Toppe herself expressed that there was no suspicion of any adoptions being illegal.

In January 2023, Toppe expressed concerns for the low birth rate numbers in the country, and that the government was particularly concerned about the developments in the districts. On another hand, she did however praise the improvements of parental allowances for both students and other women who hasn't been allowed parental allowance.

Following controversy regarding MyGame filming and streaming of child sports, Toppe expressed that the age restriction should be put at age 18 for said sports. She also expressed that there should be strict obligations of consent, while also pointing out that some children would be vulnerable in  such a position.

Personal life
Apart from politics, Toppe is a medical doctor, and has worked at the emergency room in Bergen. She quit this job during her fifth pregnancy, and now has six children with her husband Erlend.

References

External links
Kjersti Toppe Entry at stortinget.no (parliamentary website)

1967 births
Living people
Centre Party (Norway) politicians
Members of the Storting
21st-century Norwegian politicians
Ministers of Children, Equality and Social Inclusion of Norway
Women government ministers of Norway
Women members of the Storting